Archel Evrard Biniakounou (born 4 April 1994) is a Congolese long jumper.

He finished eighteenth at the 2018 African Championships and fourth at the 2019 African Games. He also competed in the 100 metres at the 2012 World Junior Championships without reaching the final.

His personal best jump is 7.95 metres, achieved in the qualifying round at the 2019 African Games in Rabat. This is the Congolese record.

References

1993 births
Living people
Republic of the Congo long jumpers
African Games competitors for the Republic of the Congo
Athletes (track and field) at the 2019 African Games